Dharmabad is a town and a municipal council in Nanded district in the state of Maharashtra, India. It is located near the state border with Telangana. It is connected by railway. An industrial training institute was established in the town in 1977.

Demographics
 India census, Dharmabad had a population of 29,936. Males constitute 51% of the population and females 49%. Dharmabad has an average literacy rate of 58%, lower than the national average of 59.5%: male literacy is 69% and, female literacy is 48%. In Dharmabad, 14% of the population is under 6 years of age.

Transport
Dharmabad is connected with the state capital, Mumbai and the capital of neighboring state Telangana, Hyderabad and other major cities like Nizamabad, Nanded and Secunderabad by train. Dharmabad is one of the biggest revenue generating station for South Central Railway. The important trains running from are the Devgiri Express, the Ajanta Express, and the Marathwada Express. The Marathwada Express starts from Dharmabad and is also known as the High Court Express because it connects the Nanded District with Aurangabad High Court.

Dharmabad is also connected with other cities by MSRTC Bus Service. For Lord Vitthal-Rakhumai devotees a bus runs from Dharmabad to Pandharpur. As Dharmabad is located on the Maharashtra–Telangana Border, TSRTC buses also visit the town.

The nearest airport is Nanded Airport. This airport is connected all major cities of India.

Education

Dharmabad is also known for its educational institutions.

Some major educational Institutions are: 

Lal Bahadur Shastri (LBS) Jr. & Sr. College, Dharmabad
Hutatma Pansare Highschool(Semi-English & Marathi Medium), Dharmabad 
Indira Gandhi Public (English medium) School, Dharmabad
 Allama Iqbal Urdu College Dharmabad. 
Zilha Parishad Girls Primary School
Zilha Parishad High school
Keshav Primary School
Saibaba Primary School
Gurukul Vidyalaya
Yasvant College Vidyalaya
Gov. ITI
Urdu school 
Jijamata Girls High School, Dharmabad
Rajaram kakani Sahakar Vidya Mandir & Junior College, Dharmabad

Gov Ded college
Gitanjali Public School (E/M)
Wisdom Techno School (E/M)
K.G.B.V.
Urdu High School.
Urdu Primary School.
kasturba gandhi girls school, Dharmabad. 
And green field public school

Major colleges
Dharmabad provides bachelor's degree courses institution are as follows:
 Lal Bahadur Shastri Mahavidhyalaya, Dharmabad

References

External links
Dharmabad homepage
Cities and towns in Nanded district
Hyderabad railway division